East Gore Eco Airpark  is located  north of East Gore, Nova Scotia, Canada.

References

External links
Page about this airport on COPA's Places to Fly airport directory

Registered aerodromes in Nova Scotia
Transport in Hants County, Nova Scotia
Buildings and structures in Hants County, Nova Scotia